Histone H4 is a protein that in humans is encoded by the HIST2H4A gene.

Histones are basic nuclear proteins that are responsible for the nucleosome structure of the chromosomal fiber in eukaryotes. This structure consists of approximately 146 bp of DNA wrapped around a nucleosome, an octamer composed of pairs of each of the four core histones (H2A, H2B, H3, and H4). The chromatin fiber is further compacted through the interaction of a linker histone, H1, with the DNA between the nucleosomes to form higher order chromatin structures. This gene is intronless and encodes a member of the histone H4 family. Transcripts from this gene lack polyA tails; instead, they contain a palindromic termination element. This gene is found in a histone cluster on chromosome 1. This gene is one of four histone genes in the cluster that are duplicated; this record represents the centromeric copy.

References

Further reading